The Sucre was the currency of Ecuador between 1884 and 2000. Its ISO code was ECS and it was subdivided into 10 decimos and 100 centavos. The sucre was named after Latin American political leader Antonio José de Sucre. The currency was replaced by the United States dollar as a result of the 1998–99 financial crisis.

History

The Ecuadorian peso was renamed as the Sucre on March 22, 1884, and was then linked to the silver standard. The Sucre was tied to 22.5 g of fine silver (equivalent to 5 LMU francs). Outdated coins were taken out of circulation between 1887 and 1892, with only the silver-backed coins remaining in circulation.

The decline of the international price of silver during the 1890s prompted Ecuador to switch to the gold standard on November 3, 1898, with the sucre tied to 732.224 mg of fine gold (equivalent to 2 shillings sterling).

The Sucre became inconvertible shortly after World War I began in 1914 due to international political tension. Despite extensive measures to support the sucre's value, the exchange rate continued to rapidly decline. The sucre's exchange rate was eventually stabilized during 1926, at which point Ecuador re-established the gold standard with the sucre equal to 300.933 mg fine gold or $0.20 USD (a devaluation of 58.8%).

Following the suspension of the gold standard on February 8, 1932, foreign exchange controls were adopted on April 30 which fixed the official buying rate at 5.95 per U.S. dollar. Once the price of silver rose above the nominal value of most silver coins during 1930s, Ecuador banned the export of silver on May 17, 1935. This was followed by several adjustments to the nation's foreign exchange system as the sucre continued to depreciate. The foreign exchange controls were finally lifted in September, 1937 and the official rate was set at 13.5 sucre per U.S. dollar. The sucre was eventually devalued to 14.77 sucre per USD on June 4, 1940, and controls were once again imposed. The official rate became 14 sucre per USD in 1942 and 13.5 per USD in 1944.

The International Monetary Fund (IMF) established the purchasing power parity of the sucre at 13.5 per USD on December 18, 1946. When the IMF adopted a system of multiple exchange rates in 1947, the sucre's IMF parity was devalued to 15 sucre per USD by 1950, 18 by 1961, and 25 per USD by 1970.

The Sucre maintained a fairly stable exchange rate against the U.S. dollar until 1983 when it was devalued to 42 per 
USD and a crawling peg was adopted. Depreciation increased rapidly and the Sucre's free market rate was over 800 per USD by 1990 and nearly 3000 by 1995. The sucre lost 67% of its foreign exchange value during 1999; its value nosedived an additional 17% over the course of one week, ending at 25,000 sucre per USD on January 7, 2000.

On January 9, President Jamil Mahuad announced that the US dollar was to be adopted as Ecuador's official currency, although the US dollar had already had wide informal use in Ecuador before this decision was made. The US dollar became legal tender in Ecuador on March 13, 2000, as sucre notes ceased to be legal tender on September 11, 2000. Sucre notes were exchangeable at a rate of 25,000 sucre per dollar at Banco Central until March 30, 2001.

Coins
In 1884, cupro-nickel one and a half centavo coins, as well as silver half decimo coins, one and two decimo coins, sucre and half sucre coins were introduced. Centavo coins minted as denominations of the peso continued to circulate after the introduction of the sucre. Copper replaced cupronickel as the material used for the one and a half centavo in 1890, while silver half decimo coins were introduced in 1893. The 10 centavo coin was called a real, with the 5 centavo coin known as a medio (meaning half). Gold 10 sucre coins were issued  in 1899 and 1900.

In 1909, cupro-nickel 1, 2 and 5 centavo coins were issued, followed by  centavos in 1917 and 10 centavos in 1918. Production of silver coins was suspended in 1916. In 1928, a new coinage was introduced consisting of a bronze 1 centavo, nickel , 5 and 10 centavos, silver 50 centavos, 1 and 2 sucres, and gold 1 condor. The 1 sucre coin was reduced from 25 grams of 90% silver to 5 grams of 72% silver, while the condor, worth 25 sucres, was equivalent to a U.S. quarter eagle coin. The new coins were dubbed Ayoras after the president, Isidro Ayora. In 1937, nickel 20 centavo and 1 sucre coins were introduced, followed by brass 5, 10 and 20 centavos in 1942 and silver 5 sucres in 1943. The last silver coins (2 and 5 sucres) were struck in 1944.

Cupro-nickel replaced brass in the 5, 10 and 20 centavos in 1946, with a cupro-nickel 1 sucre introduced in 1959. 1959 also saw the introduction of nickel-clad-steel 20 centavos, with this metal replacing others in the 5, 10 and 50 centavos and 1 sucre between 1963 and 1970.

In 1988, nickel-clad steel coins for 10, 20 and 50 sucres were introduced, while high inflation in the 1990s lead to bi-metallic coins for 100, 500 and 1000 sucres being introduced between 1995 and 1996.

Banknotes

The first sucre-denominated banknotes were issued by private banks. The Banco del Ecuador issued provisional notes for 80 centavos and 4 sucres between 1885 and 1887 due to a conversion rate of 5 pesos = 4 sucres for the earlier notes of this bank. Regular notes were issued until 1926 in denominations of 1, 2, 5, 10, 20, 50, 100, 500 and 1000 sucres. 1 sucre notes were issued by the Banco Anglo-Ecuatoriano in 1885 and 1886, and by the Banco de Quito in 1885.

The Banco de la Unión issued notes between 1887 and 1895 in denominations of 1, 5, 10, 20 and 100 sucres, while the Banco Internacional issued notes between 1887 and 1894 in denominations of 1, 5, 10, 20, 100, 500 and 1000 sucres. The Banco Comercial y Agricola issued notes between 1895 and 1925 in denominations of 1, 5, 10, 20, 50, 100, 500 and 1000 sucres. The Banco del Pinchincha issued notes for 1, 5, 10, 20, 50 and 100 sucres between 1907 and 1924. The Banco del Azuay issued 1, 2, 5 and 10 sucres notes between 1914 and 1924. The Campañia de Crédito Agricola e Industrial issued 2 and 10 sucres notes in 1921. Finally, the Banco de Decuento issued 5 and 50 sucres notes in 1923 and 1924.

In 1926, the Caja Central de Emisión y Amortización was established to effect the transition of currency issues from private banks to a central bank. It issued notes in 1926 and 1927 in denominations of 1, 2, 5, 10 and 1000 sucres which were overprints on the notes of private banks.

The first notes of the Central Bank were issued in 1928 in denominations of 5, 10, 20, 50 and 100 sucres. These notes had a gold redemption clause, promising the bearer of the currency its value in gold.. The gold clause was retained on Banco Central's notes until 1939, when the text was modified to Pagará al portador á la vista CINCO SUCRES. Additional denominations of 500 and 1000 sucres were authorized in 1944.

In 1949-1950 Banco Central introduced new notes of reduced size (157 × 68 mm) in denominations of 5, 10, 20, 50 and 100 sucres, and dropped the phrase Pagará al portador á la vista, leaving only the literal the numerical value of the presidency. All banknotes circulated since 1928 had been printed by the American Bank Note Company, but Waterlow and Sons were now given the contract for the 5 and 50 sucre notes, which were the first Ecuadorian notes to have a security thread. In the late 1950s, Waterlow was dropped in favour of Thomas de La Rue, which printed 5, 20, 50 and 100 sucre notes, while American Bank Note continued printing 5, 10, 20 and 100 sucre notes. Notes of both printers shared the same basic design, but while American Bank Note used collared planchets as a security device, de La Rue used a metal thread. These notes went through several modifications, and inflorescent security ink was introduced about 1970. A small-size 1000-sucre note was finally put into circulation in 1973.

The next change came in 1975 when the back of all circulating notes was redesigned to show the new national coat of arms. A small-size 500 sucre note appeared at the end of the 70s.

Beginning in 1984, the title Banco Central del Ecuador appears on the notes, without a printer's imprint and without Sociedad Anonima. As inflation gained momentum, higher denominations were introduced: 5000 in 1987, 10,000 in 1988, and 20,000 and 50,000 sucres notes in 1995.

Notes used during the last years of the sucre (together with 100, 500 and 1000 sucre coins) include:

S/. 5,000 (Obverse: writer/author Juan Montalvo from Ambato. Reverse: Galápagos tortoise), worth (at dollarization time) US$0.20
S/. 10,000 (Obverse: Ecuador's second (first Ecuadorian born) president Vicente Rocafuerte. Reverse: Independence Monument at Quito's main square (Plaza Grande)), worth US$0.40
S/. 20,000 (Obverse: former Conservative president Gabriel García Moreno. Reverse: Ecuador's coat of arms), worth US$0.80
S/. 50,000 (Obverse: former Liberal president Eloy Alfaro Delgado. Reverse: Ecuador's coat of arms), worth US$2.00

Historic exchange rates 
Sucres per U.S. Dollar:

2.60 (1917)
16-17 (1959-1961)
25.00 (1979)
2,564.50 (1995)
3,189.50 (1996)
3,988.30 (1997)
5,446.60 (1998)
11,786.80 (1999)
24,860.70 (January 2000)
25,000.00 (at dollarization time)

See also

Economy of Ecuador
SUCRE (currency)

References

 The "Currency" iTunes app, made by Jeffery Grossman

External links
IMF working paper on the financial crisis.
Numismatics of Ecuador
Historical banknotes of Ecuador 

Modern obsolete currencies
Economy of Ecuador
Currencies of Ecuador
Economic history of Ecuador
1884 establishments in Ecuador
2000 disestablishments in Ecuador